The Eritrean Cabinet of Ministers is headed by the President of Eritrea, Isaias Afwerki.

Legal basis
In principle, the National Assembly of Eritrea approves all candidates for the Cabinet. , the National Assembly was considered to be effectively inexistent by the Office of the United Nations High Commissioner for Human Rights.

Cabinet Ministers of Eritrea
 Minister of Agriculture — Arefaine Berhe (2007)
 Minister of Defense — Sebhat Ephrem (2007); General Filipos Woldeyohannes (2014) 
 Minister of Education — Semere Russom (2007)
 Minister of Energy & Mines — Ahmed Hajj Ali (2007); General Sebhat Ephrem
 Minister of Finance — Berhane Abrehe (2007); Berhane Habtemariam
 Minister of Fisheries & Marine Resources — Tewolde Kelati
 Minister of Foreign Affairs — Osman Saleh Mohammed (2007)
 Minister of Health — Amina Nurhusein (2007)
 Minister of Information — Ali Abdu (2007); Yemane Gebremeskel (2021)
 Minister of Justice — Fozia Hashim (2007)
 Minister of Labor & Human Welfare — Kahsay Gebrehiwet
 Minister of Land, Water, & Environment — Tesfai Gebreselassie
 Minister of Local Government — Weldenkiel Abraha
 Minister of National Development — Giorgis Tesfamichael
 Minister of Public Works — Abraha Asfaha (2007)
 Minister of Tourism — Askalu Menkerios
 Minister of Trade & Industry — Nesredin M.S.A. Bekit
 Minister of Transport & Communications — Tesfaselasie Berhane

References

Politics of Eritrea
Government of Eritrea